Dag Erik Bergman (23 October 1914 – 10 December 1984) was a Swedish diplomat.

Biography
Bergman was the son of Erik Bergman, a parish minister, and his wife Karin Bergman, née Åkerblom, and the older brother of film director Ingmar Bergman and novelist Margareta Bergman. According to Karin Lannby, Bergman was employed by the intelligence organization C-byrån and was part of the Swedish Volunteer Corps during the Winter War in Finland and active in the National League of Sweden.

Bergman received a Bachelor of Arts degree from Uppsala University in 1938 and a Candidate of Law degree from Stockholm University in 1944 before he became an attaché at the Ministry for Foreign Affairs in 1945. He was first secretary in Athens in 1963, embassy counsellor in 1970 (acting in 1965) and ambassador from 1972 to 1973. Bergman was then consul general in Hong Kong from 1973 to 1980.

Bergman was from the 1960s seriously ill, paralyzed by polio and using a wheelchair. He died in Athens in 1984.

References

1914 births
1984 deaths
Ambassadors of Sweden to Greece
Consuls-general of Sweden
Uppsala University alumni
Stockholm University
Volunteers in the Winter War
People of the C-byrån